Cherdchai Udompaichitkul (born December 16, 1941) is a retired amateur boxer from Thailand, who won the gold medal at the 1966 Asian Games in the men's bantamweight (– 54 kg) division. He represented his native country twice at the Summer Olympics: in 1964 and 1968.

References

1941 births
Living people
Bantamweight boxers
Boxers at the 1964 Summer Olympics
Boxers at the 1968 Summer Olympics
Cherdchai Udompaichitkul
Asian Games medalists in boxing
Boxers at the 1966 Asian Games
Cherdchai Udompaichitkul
Cherdchai Udompaichitkul
Medalists at the 1966 Asian Games
Cherdchai Udompaichitkul
Cherdchai Udompaichitkul